Elections for the House of Representatives of the Philippines were held on May 11, 1992. Held on the same day as the presidential election since incumbent president Corazon Aquino did not contest the election, the Laban ng Demokratikong Pilipino (LDP) served as the de facto administration party; just as all House of Representative elections, the perceived party of the president won majority of the seats in the House of Representatives. However, Fidel V. Ramos of Lakas-NUCD won the presidential election; this caused most of the newly elected congressmen to abandon the LDP for Lakas-NUCD.

The elected representatives served in the 9th Congress from 1992 to 1995.

Results

See also
9th Congress of the Philippines

Notes

D.  Lakas ng Bansa, in which Laban ng Demokratikong Pilipino originated from, won 24 seats last election.
E.  Due to Koalisyong Pambansa, seats won by Liberal Party and PDP–Laban last election were combined which totaled to 59 seats.

References

  

1992
1992 elections in the Philippines